Thomas Bonnet (born ) is a French road and cyclo-cross racing cyclist, who currently rides for UCI ProTeam . He won the bronze medal in the men's junior event at the 2016 UCI Cyclo-cross World Championships in Heusden-Zolder.

Major results

Cyclo-cross

2014-2015
 Junior Coupe de France
1st Besançon
2015–2016
 UCI Junior World Cup
1st Heusden-Zolder
 2nd Overall Junior Coupe de France
2nd Quelneuc
 3rd  UCI World Junior Championships
 3rd  UEC European Junior Championships
2016–2017
 Under-23 Coupe de France
3rd Erôme Gervans

Mountain Bike
2016
 1st  Cross-country, UCI World Junior Championships
 1st  Cross-country, UEC European Junior Championships
2019
 2nd Cross-country, National Under-23 Championships

Road

2021
 4th Overall Tour de la Guadeloupe
1st Stage 6
2022
 2nd Overall Tour de Normandie
 2nd Overall Flèche du Sud
2023
 1st Stage 4 Tour du Rwanda

References

External links

1998 births
Living people
Cyclo-cross cyclists
French male cyclists
People from Châtellerault
Cyclists from Nouvelle-Aquitaine